La virgen negra (The Black Virgin) is a Venezuelan comedy film mixed with romance and magic realism. It is the first movie of the 25-year-old filmmaker Ignacio Castillo.

The film tells the story of the strange changes in the lives of the inhabitants of a small fishing village (possibly an allusion to Barlovento) in the Venezuelan coast after the appearance of a black virgin.

The film is set in the town of Higuerote in the northern coastal state of Miranda, Venezuela.

Primary cast
Angélica Aragón as Lurdita
Carmen Maura as Sra. Isabel
Matheus Nachtergaele as Dr. Joao Pinto
Carolina Torres as Manita
Francisco Diaz as Cura Isidro
Caridad Canelón as Leonor
Julio Rodríguez as Franklin
Geily Rosales as La negrita
Cynthia Cabrera as La blanquita
Jesika Grau as Marlene
César Suárez as Virgilio
Martin Peyrou as Velero

Plot
The film begins with Franklin (Rodriguez) trying to give his first kiss to "la negrita" (Rosales) when he is suddenly interrupted by a desperate Manita (Torres), who is concerned because her husband hasn't had sex with her in months.

Manita then visits a mysterious woman, who is believed to be a witch, Lurdita (Aragon) who asks her to change the virgin of the church by the black virgin. Behind everybody's back and with the approval of Sra Isabel (Maura), the founder of the town, the black virgin becomes their new patron.

After that, strange things begin to happen in this village changing the routine of its inhabitants:  the black virgin stopped it from getting dark, stopped the invasions of the vandals, make people fell in love and at the same time killed and sickened some. On the other hand, Lurdita (who is believed to be the builder of the black virgin) leaves the town saying others might need her help.

One morning, Franklin is playing baseball and as the kids were making fun of him he hits the ball so hard that breaks the image of the black virgin. After this, the vandals took over the town and killed almost everyone on it. The only survivors are shipped in a boat to the middle of the sea. Suddenly it begins to dawn in the middle of the night and Lurdita is seen smiling at the shores of the beach marking the end of the movie.

Production

The film was made by Ignacio Castillo son of Leopoldo Castillo (host of the controversial TV show, Alo Ciudadano
The vocals of the music was done by Lisbeth Scott who also participated in the score of The Chronicles of Narnia and The Passion of the Christ.

Awards

Won
Mérida National Film Festival:
People's Choice Award

Nominated
32nd Annual São Paulo Film Festival
Best New Filmmaker (Ignacio Castillo Cottin)

References

External links

2008 films
Venezuelan comedy-drama films
2000s Spanish-language films
Romantic fantasy films
2008 romantic comedy-drama films